D46 motorway, formerly Expressway R46 is a highway in southern Czech Republic. It was built from 1974 to 1992. Currently, as the D1 highway is not finished yet, it carries all international traffic, but after completion of it, it will have only regional traffic in central Moravia.

Images

External links 
Info on ceskedalnice.cz 
Info on dalnice-silnice.cz 

R46